Herminia Duenas Dierking (August 17, 1939 – March 24, 2008) was a Guamanian educator, a cabinet member of the Government of Guam, and a Democratic Party of Guam politician in Guam. Dierking served as Senator in the Guam Legislature for 5 consecutive terms, from 1985 to 1995,

Early life
Herminia Duenas Dierking was born in Hagatna in 1939 to Jose Cruz Duenas and Maria Pangelinan Guzman.
Herminia grew up during the occupation of Guam by Japanese Imperial Forces during World War II and accompanied her mother and grandmother to Manenggon concentration camp toward the end of the occupation.

Education and career
Herminia graduated from Academy of Our Lady of Guam.
Herminia earned a Bachelor of Arts in Business at University of Guam and a Master of Science in Business Administration from Emporia State University in Kansas.
Herminia married John C. Dierking.

Herminia Dierking worked at the University of Guam for thirteen years, eventually becoming the Chairperson of the Accounting Department at the College of Business and Public Administration.
In 1983 Dierking served as Director of the Bureau of Budget Management and Research and Chairperson of the Fiscal Policy Committee of the Government of Guam.

Guam Legislature

Elections
Dierking was first elected to the Guam Legislature in 1984 and remained in office 5 legislative terms.

Leadership
 President, Association of Pacific Island Legislatures
 Chairwoman, Committee on Ways and Means, Guam Legislature
 Senator, Guam Legislature
 Chairperson, Accounting Department, College of Business and Public Administration, University of Guam
 Director, Bureau of Budget and Management Research
 Chairperson, Fiscal Policy Committee, Government of Guam
 President, Association of Government Accountants
 President, the Guam Business Education Association,
 President, Guam Business and Professional Women's Club

Death
Dierking died on March 24, 2008.

References

External links
 

1939 births
2008 deaths
20th-century American politicians
20th-century American women politicians
Chamorro people
Guamanian Democrats
Guamanian people of Spanish descent
Guamanian Roman Catholics
Guamanian women in politics
Members of the Legislature of Guam
People from Hagåtña, Guam
21st-century American women